José Pilar Reyes Requenes (born 12 October 1955) is a Mexican former football goalkeeper who played for Mexico in the 1978 FIFA World Cup. He also played for Tigres UANL.

References

External links
 
FIFA profile

1955 births
Footballers from Aguascalientes
Mexico international footballers
Association football goalkeepers
Tigres UANL footballers
1978 FIFA World Cup players
Liga MX players
Living people
Mexican footballers
CONCACAF Championship-winning players